Jung Ji-guen (born January 10, 1990) is a South Korean sport shooter. He placed 43rd in the men's 10 metre air rifle event at the 2016 Summer Olympics.

References

1990 births
Living people
ISSF rifle shooters
South Korean male sport shooters
Olympic shooters of South Korea
Shooters at the 2016 Summer Olympics